Eleanor Margolies is a writer on theater and has the first Jocelyn Herbert Fellowship at the University of the Arts London, specializing in the Jocelyn Herbert Archive of stage design.

In the 2017 United Kingdom general election, Margolies stood as the London Green Party candidate for Camberwell and Peckham. In 2019, she was number 5 on the Green Party list for the London region in the European Parliament elections. Neither time was she elected.

Selected publications

References 

Year of birth missing (living people)
Living people
Academics of the University of the Arts London
Green Party of England and Wales parliamentary candidates
British women writers